Dr. Eslambolchi, Hossein  is an Iranian-American innovator, theoretical and experimental physicist, engineer, and author, best known for his prominent role in AT&T, very popular blogs on Linkedin, besides being one of the top 10 most prolific and exceptional inventor with over 1400+ patents List of Prolific Inventors. Dr. Eslambolchi has also a doctorate degree in Neuroscience as well. achieved in June 2022. He joined AT&T Bell Laboratories in 1986, and rose to become, in 2005, both global Chief Technology and Information Officer for AT&T.  He became an Officer of the company in 2003, as well as a member of AT&T's governing Executive Committee and became AT&T Chief Technology Officer, AT&T Chief Information Officer, President, & CEO of AT&T Labs, President & CEO of AT&T Global Network Operations. Dr. Eslambolchi was assigned by AT&T as Chief Transformation Officer responsible for moving ATT from a voice-based company to an IP-Software-based company in less than 3 years. He left AT&T soon after its takeover by SBC in 2006. And  For his doctorate degree, Dr. Eslambolchi invented the concept of beam forming being used today in advanced 5G mobile systems along with ultrasound technology being used in medical applications worldwide. In addition, after leaving ATT, Dr. Eslambolchi started his medical degree in neuroscience and graduated specializing in both neurodegenerative diseases of the brain along with spinal cord injuries using stem cell technology in order to heal patients and even prevent these diseases via therapeutic medications in near future. Dr. Eslambolchi is recognized as one of the best neurosurgeon across the globe. 

He is currently a Venture Partner at Cloudscale Capital Partners (https://cloudscalecapital.com/) & Chairman and CEO of 2020  Venture Partners (www.2020vp.com). His last two startups have been very successful and were sold,   CyberFlow Analytics was sold to Webroot (www.webroot.com) in August 2016 & Hyper Office was sold in June  2013.

AT&T Years 
Dr. Eslambolchi joined AT&T Bell Laboratories in 1986 and was soon appointed global Chief Technology Officer, Global Chief Information Officer, President and CEO of AT&T Labs, President & CEO of AT&T Global Network Services & was a 16B officer of the company beginning in 2001. He also served as a critical member of AT&T's governing Executive Committee. As CTO of AT&T, he developed and executed a comprehensive four-stage strategy that included Enterprise Customer Service, Network Transformation, Service Transformation, and Cultural Transformation, all in a span of just three years. Essentially, he initiated and instigated the overhaul and remodeling of the company dubbed the "new AT&T" by SBC. The New York Times called him "the technological strategist behind AT&T's ambitious turnaround plan to become a data transmission company selling an array of software products like network security systems," (01/22/2005). He predicted and advocated an architecture that would allow all services to run on IP and work together with connectivity to any device and advised top leaders accordingly on the formulation and implementation of his strategic technologic vision. He left AT&T soon after its merger with SBC in January 2006. Upon his departure, Business Week called him "a critical player in maintaining AT&T's status as a technology leader" (12/2005) and noted that he is "a bold, but pragmatic, visionary."

Dr. Eslambolchi served as Chief Technology Officer and advised AT&T's top leaders on the formulation and implementation of a strategic technology vision from 2001 to 2005. Early on, he predicted that IP would "eat everything" and advocated an MPLS architecture based on Ethernet being the layer 2 backbone that would allow all services to run on IP and work together with connectivity to any device, in any place using location-based services. In addition, his significant service ideas regarding routers, security, hosting, cloud computing, virtualization, and collaboration were implemented to increase company revenue by as much as $5B. He worked tirelessly with Sales, Marketing and Product Management to implement his ideas in support of customer needs in both the enterprise and consumers' markets. The New York Times credited Dr. Eslambolchi as "the technological strategist behind AT&T's ambitious turnaround plan to become a data transmission company selling an array of software products like network security systems," (01/2005).

In addition to serving as CTO of AT&T, Dr. Eslambolchi was also President of AT&T's Global Networking Technology Services, President and CEO of AT&T Labs & Chief Information Officer, giving him end-to-end responsibility for implementing the company's technology and operational vision of the 21st century. As President and CEO of AT&T Labs, he led a team of some of the world's best scientists and engineers in developing an architecture that transformed AT&T's legacy voice and data networks into a converged IP/MPLS network that now reaches all major business centers around the globe.

Dr. Eslambolchi designed a state-of-the-art architecture called Service Over IP in which all legacy services can migrate over to new architecture at the lowest cost, highest capability & lowest cycle time. He developed several patents for product managers and sales groups across the enterprise and consumer markets to able to enhance revenue streams using this MPLS architecture.  As CTO, he led the company strategy and direction for new innovative services around call center application, e-collaboration & virtualization in both wireline and wireless infrastructures.  Dr. Eslambolchi, in a very short period of time, helped transform AT&T from being perceived as ports and pipes into a single global wireless company using state-of-the-art technologies and advised the AT&T Board of Directors on which access technologies to invest in for the future success of the company.

As President of Global Network Services, Dr. Eslambolchi was responsible for the design, development, engineering, operations, and reliability of AT&T's global network, as well as for its Global Network Operations Center (GNOC) – AT&T's networking nerve center. Dr. Eslambolchi was the main architect, engineer, and implementer of this new GNOC, which came to fruition in 18 months. He oversaw and managed several tens of thousands of employees in both the engineering and operations divisions of AT&T Corporation.

As Chief Information and Investment Officer, he provided the leadership that re-engineered AT&T's underlying information technology (IT) infrastructures with his unique Concept of One and Concept of Zero business processes. While moving AT&T's legacy networks onto an IP/MPLS platform, he also directed the convergence of the operating support and customer service systems underlying the network, making AT&T the lowest-cost major carrier. This also improved cycle times and allowed customers unprecedented access to the network that permits them to monitor and control their services. More can be found on his superb innovation at www.2020vp.com. He also managed over $14B in Capital Expenses (Capex) and $20B annually in operating expenses for AT&T.

As an author, Dr. Eslambolchi published his new book with his co-authors (Mr. Kaveh Hushyar and Harald Braun) https://www.amazon.com/Telecom-Extreme-Transformation-Digital-Provider/dp/0367750139/ref=sr_1_1?crid=2AEHUL9L04ZXC&keywords=telecommunications+hossein+eslambolchi&qid=1663875981&sprefix=telecommunications+hossein+eslambolchi%2Caps%2C125&sr=8-1 & 2020 Vision (https://www.amazon.com/2020-Vision-Transformation-Technology-Innovation/dp/0929306392/ref=sr_1_2?crid=21AZ5BYLIKP39&keywords=2020+vision+hossein+eslambolchi&qid=1663876028&sprefix=2020+vision+hossein+eslambolchi%2Caps%2C149&sr=8-2). Dr. Eslambolchi is also a neurosurgeon in the field of neuroscience using stem cells for identifying neurodegenerative diseases of the brain with highly strong success rate.

Life and work 
Dr. Eslambolchi is the great-grandson of Iranian prime minister Mohsen Sadr; he is also a descendant of the famous Persian aristocrat Anoushirvan (Shir) Khan Qajar Qovanlou 'Eyn ol-Molk' 'Etezad od-Doleh' and through him, he is twice a descendant of the nineteenth-century Persian king Fath Ali Shah. Dr. Eslambolchi graduated with the highest honors from the University of California, San Diego, earning BS, MS, Ph.D., and Post Doc in Applied Physics. From 2010 through 2013, he served on the Board of Directors for Clearwire. Dr. Eslambolchi served on the Board of Trustees for SUSMA and technical advisor to the University of California School of Engineering where he started the CNS center for bringing together various computing and engineering fields.

Awards and Patents 
 Extreme Network Transformation by Dr. Eslambolchi, Kaveh Hushyar, and Harald Braun, www.amazon.com
 Awarded Ellis Island Medal of Honor - May 2017 
 Appointed to the AT&T Fellow, AT&T's highest technical honor, in 1999.
 Named R&D "Inventor of the Year" by the Research & Development Council of New Jersey, 2002 and 2013 
 Holds over 1400+ worldwide patents (Received, Pending, and in-preparation, www.uspto.org
 AT&T Science & Technology Medal and AT&T Significant Patent Award, 1997.
 Top 10 Most Influential CTOs of 2005 (InfoWorld) 
 #1 'mover and shaker' in telecommunications, Light Reading, 2003, for his visionary prediction of IP and MPLS worldwide in 2003 
 10 Internet Business Leaders of 2005 (Cisco IQ Magazine).
 Premier 100 IT Leaders of 2004 (Computerworld Magazine).
 Top Ten Innovators of 2003, Executive Council of New York.
 IEEE Chairman Quality Award, for improving the reliability of IP networks worldwide, 2008.
 Innovator of the Year, 2003 (Cisco Systems).
 Top 100 influential technology leaders of the 21st century, (Sun Microsystems).
 Top 100 alumni at the University of California, San Diego.
  Dr. Hossein Eslambolchi One of the Top 200 LinkedIn influencers along with over 150+ Blogs and 350,000+ followers
 2020 Vision Book by Dr. Eslambolchi, www.amazon.com - 2006

References

External links 
 A half-hour presentation from Supernova 2005, recorded June 21, 2005, care of IT Conversations
 rtsp://media.cmpnet.com/twtoday_media/nc/CEO_CTO/Hossein.rm RealMedia: video interview, care of Networkcomputing.com
 
 
 The concept of One and zero  & www.2020vp.com
 
 Official 2020VP Bio
 

 American inventors
 American male writers
 University of California, San Diego alumni
21st-century American physicists
American telecommunications industry businesspeople
AT&T people
 American writers of Iranian descent
 American chief technology officers
 Chief information officers
 Living people
 Year of birth missing (living people)